Françoise Thiry (born 28 June 1945) is a Belgian equestrian. She competed in the team jumping event at the 1972 Summer Olympics.

References

1945 births
Living people
Belgian female equestrians
Olympic equestrians of Belgium
Equestrians at the 1972 Summer Olympics
Place of birth missing (living people)